Ar'Darius Washington (born November 2, 1999) is an American football safety for the Baltimore Ravens of the National Football League (NFL). He played college football at TCU.

Early years
Washington attended Evangel Christian Academy in Shreveport, Louisiana, where he was a star cornerback for the Eagles.  Prior to his senior season, he committed to play college football at LSU, but eventually switched his commitment to play at Texas Christian University in Fort Worth, Texas.

College career
As a true freshman at TCU in 2018, Washington transitioned to safety and played in four games for the TCU Horned Frogs to preserve his redshirt.  He enjoyed a breakout season as a redshirt freshman in 2019, becoming a starter late in the year and led the team with five interceptions - the most by any freshman under coach Gary Patterson in his tenure at TCU.  After the season, he was named the Big 12 Defensive Freshman of the Year. and a Freshman All-American by the Football Writers Association of America.

Prior to Washington's sophomore season in 2020, he was named to the All-Texas College Team by Dave Campbell's Texas Football, as one of the top returning players in the Big 12 by ESPN and as the nation's second-leading returning safety behind his teammate Trevon Moehrig by Pro Football Focus.  Additionally, he was projected as a first-round selection in the 2021 NFL Draft by CBS Sports.

On December 29, 2020, Washington announced that he would forgo his final two seasons of collegiate eligibility by declaring for the 2021 NFL Draft.

Professional career

Baltimore Ravens
Washington signed with the Baltimore Ravens as an undrafted free agent on May 13, 2021. On November 27, 2021, Washington suffered a season-ending foot injury and was placed on injured reserve.

On August 30, 2022, Washington was waived by the Ravens and signed to the practice squad the next day. He was promoted to the active roster on January 14, 2023.

References

External links
TCU Horned Frogs bio

1999 births
Living people
American football safeties
Players of American football from Shreveport, Louisiana
Evangel Christian Academy alumni
TCU Horned Frogs football players
Baltimore Ravens players